Marek Haščák (born 8 December 1985) is a Slovak former professional ice hockey centre.

Prior to the 2011-12 season, he had been under a try-out contract with the Malmö Redhawks of the HockeyAllsvenskan, however that try-out contract expired at the end of August 2011.

Career statistics

References

External links

Living people
1985 births
HC Karlovy Vary players
HK Dukla Trenčín players
HK Nitra players
HK Riga 2000 players
HKM Zvolen players
MHk 32 Liptovský Mikuláš players
New York Islanders scouts
Shawinigan Cataractes players
ŠHK 37 Piešťany players
Slovak ice hockey centres
Sportspeople from Trenčín
Slovak expatriate ice hockey players in Canada
Slovak expatriate ice hockey players in the Czech Republic
Expatriate ice hockey players in Latvia
Slovak expatriate sportspeople in Latvia